Tom Arvid Paul Löfstedt, born 18 May 1954 in Stockholm, is a Swedish sailor. He has won multiple championships in Sweden, placed second in the European championships and in 2004 he won the Dragon 75th Anniversary Regatta. He mostly sails Star and J/70.

Merits 
Merits as Helmsman in official championships between 1969-1984 and 2002–present:

 19 Gold in the Swedish Championships
 6 Gold in the Nordic Championships
 2 Silver in the World Championships
 1 Silver in the European Championships
 2 Bronze in the European Championships

References 

1954 births
Living people
Swedish male sailors (sport)
Sportspeople from Stockholm